Frank Griffin (September 17, 1886 – March 17, 1953) was an American film director, writer, and actor of the silent era. He directed 29 films between 1914 and 1924. He was born in Norfolk, Virginia, and died in Los Angeles, California from a heart attack.

Selected filmography

 A Brewerytown Romance (1914)
 The Kidnapped Bride (1914)
 Worms Will Turn (1914)
 The Green Alarm (1914)
 A Fool There Was (1914)
 Pins Are Lucky (1914)
 When the Ham Turned (1914)
 The Honor of the Force (1914)
 Dobs at the Shore (1914)
 They Looked Alike (1915)
 Cannibal King (1915)
 Where Love Leads (1916)
 The King of the Kitchen (1918)
 Lions and Ladies (1919)
 Her First Kiss (1919)

Preservation
Griffin's film Her First Kiss was preserved by the Academy Film Archive, in conjunction with 20th Century Fox, in 2013.

References

External links

1886 births
1953 deaths
American film directors
American male film actors
American male screenwriters
20th-century American male actors
20th-century American male writers
20th-century American screenwriters